Honeymoon Tavern (Hangul: 우도 주막; RR: Udo Jumag) is a South Korean travel-reality show premiered on July 12, 2021 that airs on every Monday at 10:30pm KST on tvN and TVING online platform. Meanwhile, tvN Asia premiered the show on July 22, 2021 at 10:30pm GMT+8, every Thursdays onward.

Overview 
This show is being created during the COVID-19 pandemic, where people can't easily travel around due to safety precautions. Even an ordinary wedding has now became an old story and henceforth, a ‘Newlyweds Only’ tavern opens on Udo, Jeju Island, an island within an island!

A group of celebrity cast runs the tavern as a guest house for newlyweds only and serve the guests with homemade foods and drinks, while creating a memorable honeymoon for newlywed couples who got married during the pandemic with some surprise events. Look forward for the sweet and savory first night in Udo!

Cast

Guest Employee

Episode

International Broadcast 
OTT Viu is serving this show to its respective local viewers starting from July 13 onwards.

Concurrently, tvN Asia premiered this show on July 22 at 10:30pm for GMT +8 regions and 9:30pm for GMT +7 regions of the platforms that serves tvN Asia channel.

Ratings 

 In the tables below, the blue numbers represent the lowest ratings and the red numbers represent the highest ratings.
 These ratings are the collection for cable TVs which are separated from the national TV broadcasting's rating collection.

References 

South Korean reality television series
2021 South Korean television series debuts
TVN (South Korean TV channel) original programming